John Ole Aspli (born 7 May 1956) is a Norwegian politician for the Labour Party.

He served as a deputy representative to the Norwegian Parliament from Møre og Romsdal during the term 2005–2009.

On the local level he is mayor of Rindal municipality since 2007.

References

1956 births
Living people
Deputy members of the Storting
Labour Party (Norway) politicians
Mayors of places in Møre og Romsdal
Place of birth missing (living people)